The Cromwell Mountains is a mountain range on the Huon Peninsula in north-eastern Papua New Guinea.

The range is part of the Huon Peninsula montane rain forests. The character and species composition of the forests varies with elevation. Species of Castanopsis and Lithocarpus are the predominant trees in the lower montane forests, which extend from approximately 1000 to 2,000 meters elevation. Above 2,000 meters species of Xanthomyrtus, Vaccinium, and Rhododendron are common, transitioning to Lithocarpus–Elmerrillia forests at approximately 2,300 m. Above 2,400 meters, forests are dominated by broadleaved Elaeocarpus and the conifers Phyllocladus, Podocarpus, and Dacrydium. The mountains are home to the most extensive unlogged Dacrydium forests in the Southern Hemisphere.

References

Mountain ranges of Papua New Guinea
Huon Peninsula montane rain forests